Royal Air Force Station Barkway or more simply RAF Barkway was one of the smallest Royal Air Force stations in the United Kingdom.  It was a Communications Station and was a small collection of buildings and a large radio mast.

History

It was originally opened as a monitor station on 22 June 1942 for the Gee (navigation) network in the Eastern area.

The site was used by the United States Air Forces in Europe (USAFE). It was part of communications network linking:
RAF Chicksands
RAF Mildenhall
RAF Lakenheath
RAF Feltwell
RAF Molesworth (via RAF Chelveston)
RAF Alconbury
RAF Croughton

In September 2008, the station was broken into by a BASE jumper who climbed the mast and then jumped off and deployed his parachute.

Current use

The site was sold in early 2011 as surplus to the Ministry of Defence (MOD) requirements.

See also
 List of former Royal Air Force stations

References

External links
  Photo of RAF Barkway accessed 2008-10-02

Installations of the United States Air Force in the United Kingdom
Royal Air Force stations in Hertfordshire
RAF